Yolanda Casaus Rodríguez (Alcañiz, Teruel Province, 3 July 1974) is a Spanish politician who belongs to the Spanish Socialist Workers' Party.

Single, Casaus worked as an infant teacher in the Juan Ramón Alegre de Andorra state school in Teruel. She was affiliated with the major Spanish Trade Union the Unión General de Trabajadores and served as a Union representative. She also held positions of responsibility in the Young Socialists of Aragon, the local youth wing of the PSOE.

In 2004 she was elected to the national parliament as a deputy for Teruel, being re-elected in 2008.

References

External links
 Biography at Spanish Congress website
 Personal blog

1974 births
Living people
People from Alcañiz
Spanish Socialist Workers' Party politicians
Members of the 8th Congress of Deputies (Spain)
Members of the 9th Congress of Deputies (Spain)
21st-century Spanish women politicians